Ben O'Connor (born 21 December 1988) is a British ice hockey player who currently plays for Elite Ice Hockey League (EIHL) side Guildford Flames.

O'Connor most recently played for Erste Liga side HSC Csíkszereda and he also plays for the British national team.

He represented Great Britain at the 2019 IIHF World Championship, 2021 IIHF World Championship and 2022 IIHF World Championship.

After leaving the Sheffield Steelers in 2020, O'Connor moved to NIHL side Sheffield Steeldogs. The move came after the 2020-21 Elite League season was suspended indefinitely due to ongoing coronavirus restrictions.

In August 2021, O'Connor signed terms with EIHL side Cardiff Devils. He departed Cardiff in December 2021. He later joined Romanian side HSC Csíkszereda.

In July 2022, O'Connor returned to the EIHL to sign for Guildford Flames.

References

External links

1988 births
Arlan Kokshetau players
Basingstoke Bison players
British expatriate ice hockey people
English expatriate sportspeople in Canada
English expatriate sportspeople in France
English expatriate sportspeople in Kazakhstan
English expatriate sportspeople in Sweden
Cardiff Devils players
Coventry Blaze players
Edinburgh Capitals players
English ice hockey defencemen
Guildford Flames players
HSC Csíkszereda players
Hull Thunder players
Leksands IF players
Living people
Mississauga IceDogs players
Saryarka Karagandy players
Sheffield Steelers players
Sportspeople from Durham, England
Windsor Spitfires players
Expatriate ice hockey players in Kazakhstan
Expatriate ice hockey players in Canada
Expatriate ice hockey players in Sweden
English expatriate sportspeople in Romania
Expatriate ice hockey players in Romania
Expatriate ice hockey players in France